The Lemme is a torrent in north-western Italy.

It is also a surname (or rarely a given name) which may refer to:
 Alicia Lemme (born 1954), Argentine politician
 Armin Lemme (born 1955), German track and field athlete
 Betta Lemme (born 1993), Canadian singer-songwriter
 Helen Lemme (1904–1968), American civil rights activist
 Steve Lemme (born 1968), American actor and producer
 Lemme Rossi (died 1673), Italian music theorist

See also
 Lemmes, commune in Grand-Est, France